Mount Pleasant is a neighborhood in the northwestern quadrant of Washington, D.C. It is bounded by Rock Creek Park to the north and west; Harvard Street NW to the south; and 16th Street NW to the east. It is north of Adams Morgan and west of Columbia Heights. It is home to about 10,000 people.

The western four-fifths of the neighborhood is a largely wooded residential enclave bounded on two sides by Rock Creek Park, just east of the National Zoo. Structures in this area are primarily row houses of Neoclassical architecture with rear porches, with some subdivided into multiple apartments. The Eighteen Hundred Block Park Road, NW is notable for its 10 detached "suburban" houses on terraces overlooking the street. The 12 buildings at 1644–1666 Park Road NW, designed by Appleton P. Clark Jr. in the style of Colonial Revival architecture, were completed in 1906.

The eastern side of the neighborhood, along 16th Street NW and Mount Pleasant Street, is marked by mid-rise apartment buildings. These buildings offer rental apartments, condominiums and housing cooperatives. A four-block commercial corridor with convenience shopping extends along Mount Pleasant Street. It is also walking distance from larger retail developments in Columbia Heights.

The neighborhood is served by the Mount Pleasant Line and the Crosstown Line buses.

A series of "Heritage Trail" historical markers are installed in Mount Pleasant. The markers, which may be followed as a walking tour, consist of 17 poster-sized street signs featuring narrative, photographs and maps.

History
In 1727, Charles Calvert, 5th Baron Baltimore, then governor of the Province of Maryland, awarded a land grant for present-day Mount Pleasant to James Holmead. This estate included the territory of present-day Adams Morgan, Columbia Heights, and Pleasant Plains neighborhoods. James's son, Anthony, inherited the estate in 1750 and named it Pleasant Plains. After the United States Congress created the District of Columbia in 1791, Pleasant Plains estate became part of Washington County, a section of the District lying between what now is Florida Avenue and the Maryland border. The Holmeads gradually sold off all tracts of the Pleasant Plains estate.

In 1794 and 1796, Robert Peter, Georgetown's pioneer businessman, conducted title descriptions. He created maps for tracts of some of his land in Mount Pleasant for transactions with commissioners of the city.

In 1861, William Selden, Treasurer of the United States from 1839 to 1850, owned  of land north of Pierce Mill Road. In 1862, during the American Civil War, Selden, a Confederate sympathizer, was forced to sell his land at a low price and move back to his native Virginia. The purchaser was New England native Samuel P. Brown. Brown built a house and allowed the Mount Pleasant General Hospital to be constructed on his land. In June 1863, Walt Whitman saw "a train of about thirty huge four-horse wagons, used as ambulances, filled with wounded, passing up Fourteenth street" traveling from the Siege of Petersburg to the 1,600-bed hospital.

After the American Civil War, Brown began selling his land in parcels. He named the area Mount Pleasant Village because it contained the land having the highest elevation within the original Pleasant Plains estate. Brown sold all of his land except for the parcel he retained around his house at 3351 Mount Pleasant Street, NW. His house was demolished in the 1890s.

Although Mount Pleasant was within the District of Columbia, it was separated from the city of Washington by vacant land and was rural by comparison.

In the 1870s, a horse-drawn streetcar began traveling between the Fourteenth and Park intersection to downtown Washington city, making this the first streetcar suburb in the District of Columbia. In 1878, Mount Pleasant merged into Washington when the city's boundaries became coterminous with those of the District.

In 1901, 16th Street NW was extended north of Florida Avenue, establishing the boundary of the neighborhood.

Mount Pleasant developed rapidly as a streetcar suburb after the expansion of the mechanized Washington streetcars along 16 1/2 Street (now Mount Pleasant Street) in 1903.

In 1907, developer Fulton R. Gordon purchased large sections of the neighborhood, marketing lots as "Mount Pleasant Heights" with Robert E. Heater. Many houses and apartment buildings were constructed between 1900 and 1925. Mount Pleasant was marketed to middle- to upper middle class people.

In 1925, the city built the Mount Pleasant Library, designed by Edward Lippincott Tilton and partially funded by philanthropist Andrew Carnegie, to serve the growing community.

By 1927, all homeowners in the neighborhood had signed restrictive covenants forbidding sale to African Americans. By the time of World War II, many of the row houses were converted to boarding houses, many of which were occupied by single women.

The neighborhood changed after the 1948 decision by the United States Supreme Court in the case of Shelley v. Kraemer, which struck down the restrictive covenants. After an African American Howard University professor moved into a prestigious Park Road home in 1950, some white residents began to leave the neighborhood. Whites fled to the suburbs as blacks moved in. This form of suburbanization, often referred to as White flight, increased after the 1968 riots. By 1970, the neighborhood was 65% black.

Beginning in the 1960s and increasing through the 1980s, immigrants from Central America, particularly from Intipucá, El Salvador, settled in the neighborhood. The new residents developed businesses catering to Hispanic and Latino Americans along commercial portions of Mount Pleasant Street. The neighborhood also attracted former Peace Corps workers, who liked the diversity. Businesses included a grocery store and pharmacy, restaurants, low-priced retail stores and services.

In 1973, the Community of Christ, a lay-led Lutheran group dedicated to social justice, bought a large building on Mount Pleasant Street and made it available rent-free to peace activists, pro-immigrant groups and musicians. In the 1980s, the group house scene flourished.

However, in the late 1970s and the 1980s and until the early 1990s, the neighborhood suffered from the crack cocaine epidemic and the illegal drug trade was rampant. There were several strip clubs along Mount Pleasant Street. Muggings and robberies were common.

In 1987, the neighborhood was designated as a historic district.

The neighborhood was majority-minority in 1990, with African Americans making up 36% of the population, Latinos 26%, and whites 35%.

In May 1991, a black female police officer shot a Latino man, leading to the Washington, D.C. riot of 1991. Two days of fighting erupted between the Salvadoran Latinos and blacks in the neighborhood, accompanied by looting, arson and attacks on the police. There was significant damage to police cars and buses, twelve people were injured but no one was killed. In response, the Metropolitan Police Department of the District of Columbia, under Chief Isaac Fulwood, and city government began an outreach effort to the Latino population.

Per the 2010 United States census, the ZIP Code 20010, which includes Mount Pleasant, was one of the "most whitened" areas of the country, with the percentage of non-Hispanic white residents increasing from 22% in 2000 to 46.7% in 2010.

As of 2021, housing prices had risen significantly.
The neighborhood, which has long attracted immigrants, activists, punk rockers, entrepreneurs, revolutionaries and returning Peace Corps volunteers continues to retain its independent personality, a community set apart physically and culturally from downtown.

Population
The population of Mount Pleasant, according to the 2010 census, was 10,459, down from 11,794 in 2000.

Incomes rose during this time period.

Education
 District of Columbia Public Schools operates the public schools.
 Bancroft Elementary School, 1755 Newton Street NW
 Private Religious Schools.
 Sacred Heart School, 1625 Park Road NW
 District of Columbia Public Library operates the Mount Pleasant Neighborhood Library, at 3160 16th Street NW.

Notable people
Notable people from the neighborhood include:
 Adrian Fenty, former mayor of Washington, D.C.
 Helen Hayes, actress
 Walter Johnson, Washington Senators pitcher
 Sarah Doan La Fetra, temperance worker
 Suzanne La Follette, journalist and author
 Robert La Follette, politician
 Ian MacKaye, (resident, native of Arlington, VA.) musician, Minor Threat and Fugazi
 Bob Mondello, film critic

References

External links

ANC1D, The Mount Pleasant Advisory Neighborhood Commission
Historic Mount Pleasant - volunteer-based membership organization formed in 1985 to support preservation of historic sites
Why is It Named Mt. Pleasant? - Ghosts of DC history blog

Historic districts on the National Register of Historic Places in Washington, D.C.
Streetcar suburbs
Queen Anne architecture in Washington, D.C.
1865 establishments in Washington, D.C.
Neighborhoods in Northwest (Washington, D.C.)